San Dieguito High School Academy, originally known as San Dieguito Union High School and San Dieguito High School, is a public high school in the San Dieguito Union High School District of Encinitas, California in San Diego County. The school was established in 1936.

General information
2,059 students were enrolled at San Dieguito High School Academy in the 2020-21 school year with a senior class of over 450 students. The pupil-teacher ratio is 25:1. The average SAT score in 2013–2014 was 1840 and the average ACT score was 27. The student body is 67% Caucasian, 22% Hispanic, 4% Asian/Pacific Islander, and 5% other. During the 2020-21 school year, San Dieguito Academy's senior class had a 97.9% graduation rate.

History
The school was founded in 1936 as the first public high school within the new San Dieguito Union High School District, educating students in grades 8 through 12.

As the campus had not yet been built when school started September 14, 1936, students attended classes in tents.

In 1996, San Dieguito High School was re-designed as a "school of choice" and renamed San Dieguito High School Academy to offer a student centered environment for a maximum of 1,450 students.

All students living within the district may enroll at either La Costa Canyon High School or Torrey Pines High School within their attendance areas, but they are also eligible to attend San Dieguito Academy and Canyon Crest Academy, both of which are designed to be "schools of choice." Typically, more students apply than there are available spaces, so a lottery of applicants is conducted to determine who may attend. New students with siblings that already attend SDA are automatically enrolled to the school.

Many years this lottery is challenged due to students and parents desire to go to San Dieguito Academy. In 2022 a lottery was reimplemented for the first time since 2015 because 491 students chose the school as their top choice and only 428 spots were available. This would raise the capacity to 137 more students than there were in the 2021-2022 school year. In an attempt to amend the lottery, many argued that students living within walking distance should be given priority, however, under the Open Enrollment Act of 1993, location cannot be used to prioritize individuals in a lottery.

One hallmark of a San Dieguito Union High School District academy is a "4x4" class schedule as opposed to a more traditional "rotating block schedule". This means that students may take four 90-minute classes every day during an 18-week course, completing eight classes (80 credits) a year.

In 1998, the school had roughly 1000 students, and by 2002, had 1500 (population limits of district high schools and academies are required to grow relative to the district). Fall 2003 enrollment was 1462.

In the fall of 2015, construction began on the new Math and Science building in the place of old Senior Court. Construction funded by SDUHSD voter-approved Proposition AA bond measure.

In March 2020, SDUHSD began its Distance Learning Plan by closing schools district wide. Many students were able to return to campus on January 4, 2021 in a hybrid setting, allowing students to choose to learn from home or return to campus. Students were welcomed back to campus full time at the start of the 2021-2022 school year.

Athletics
San Dieguito Academy is part of the California Interscholastic Federation (CIF), and is a member of the North County Conference playing in the Avocado West. Student athletes may participate in 21 varsity/junior varsity level sports. A unique aspect of the San Dieguito High School Academy experience is that the Academy does house a football team, instead there is an annual flag football tournament students can decide to participate in

Notable faculty
Orville B. Karge (1919–1990), physics teacher. In 1991, the International Astronomical Union approved the naming of the minor planet 4822 Karge in his honor at the request of his students.

Notable alumni

Emily Ratajkowski, model and actress
Eddie Vedder, lead singer of alternative rock band Pearl Jam. Vedder is not technically an alumni as he dropped out his senior year
Rob Machado, professional surfer (semi-retired)
Frankie Hejduk, professional soccer player (USA, MLS and Bundesliga)
Travis Browne,  UFC heavyweight fighter
Carl Chang, tennis player and 1996 "Coach of the Year" in Tennis magazine
Michael Chang, professional tennis player, winner of 1989 French Open
Tom Dempsey, (born 1941), longtime NFL placekicker, record-setter for longest field goal ever (1970), participant in 1969 Pro Bowl
John Fairchild, basketball player for Los Angeles Lakers and Anaheim Amigos, 16th pick of 1965 NBA draft
Jon Foreman, songwriter and lead singer of alternative rock band Switchfoot
Tim Foreman, bassist of alternative rock band Switchfoot
Tak Fujimoto, cinematographer
Lukas Gage, actor
Ian Goodfellow, Director of Machine Learning in the Special Projects Group at Apple computer
Kurt Grote, gold medalist in 400 meter medley relay swim at 1996 Summer Olympics
Chris Hillman, bass guitarist, The Byrds
Jonathan Jones, singer/songwriter for We Shot the Moon and Waking Ashland
Keith Kartz, former NFL center for Denver Broncos, played in Super Bowl
Mike Kozlowski, former NFL football player for Miami Dolphins, played in two Super Bowls
Greg Minton, former pitcher for San Francisco Giants
Denise Mueller-Korenek, bicycle speed world record holder 
Andy Parker, former NFL football player for Los Angeles Raiders and San Diego Chargers
Dan Quinn, football player, MMA fighter, and boxer
Bridget Regan, actress, star of television series Legend of the Seeker
Shane Salerno, screenwriter, producer and documentary filmmaker
Anoushka Shankar an American-British-Indian sitar player and composer. She is the daughter of Ravi Shankar and the half-sister of Norah Jones
Jon Stanley, volleyball player, 1964 and 1968 Olympics
Bryce Wettstein, Olympic skateboarder

References

External links
 San Dieguito High School Academy
 Online School Newspaper, The Mustang
 Official Site of San Dieguito High School Academy Alumni
 San Dieguito High School Academy Foundation

San Dieguito Union High School District
High schools in San Diego County, California
Educational institutions established in 1936
Encinitas, California
Public high schools in California
1936 establishments in California